Hârsești is a commune in Argeș County, Muntenia, Romania. It is composed of three villages: Ciobani, Hârsești and Martalogi.

Natives
 Mircea Fulger

References

Communes in Argeș County
Localities in Muntenia